This Is Forever is the second full-length studio album by She Wants Revenge. It was released on October 9, 2007. The cover art replicates that of their debut, She Wants Revenge, but with a black-themed twist: the model is wearing black underwear and a funeral veil, while the back cover reveals she's holding a black rose behind her back  instead of a kitchen knife.

Track listing
 "First, Love" – 1:52
 "Written in Blood" – 5:00
 "Walking Away" – 3:42
 "True Romance" – 4:10
 "What I Want" – 3:42
 "It's Just Begun" – 4:06
 "She Will Always Be a Broken Girl" – 5:22
 "This Is the End" – 5:44
 "Checking Out" – 5:35
 "Pretend the World Has Ended" – 4:14
 "Replacement" – 5:32
 "All Those Moments" – 2:36
 "Rachael" – 4:27
 "...And A Song For Los Angeles" – 5:02 (Best Buy Bonus Track)
 "What I Want" (SWR Remix) – 3:58 (Indie Record Store Bonus Track)

iTunes bonus track
 "Love to Sleep" - 5:33

Personnel
Justin Warfield – vocals, guitars, keyboards
"Adam 12" Bravin – bass, keyboards, guitars, drum machine, percussion, programming, vocals
Michael Patterson – mixing
Scott Ellis - drums

Exclusives
 Circuit City's Edition comes with a free poster.
 Best Buy's Version comes with a free ringtone for "True Romance," as well as an exclusive bonus track, "...And A Song For Los Angeles."
 iTunes US has a bonus track, "Love to Sleep," with purchase of the full album.
 Some independent record stores have a version with an SWR remix of "What I Want" as a bonus track on the cd as well as a free red vinyl 12-inch which features an instrumental version of "Written In Blood" (as well as the album version) and the dark instrumental track "These Two Words."

Charts

References

2007 albums
Dark wave albums
She Wants Revenge albums
Geffen Records albums